Fausto Mariano Vera (born 26 March 2000) is an Argentine professional footballer who plays as a midfielder for Corinthians.

Club career
Vera started his career with Argentinos Juniors. He was promoted into their senior team during 2018–19, making his debut in the Argentine Primera División against Tigre in November 2018; coming off the bench for Ignacio Méndez in an away loss at the Estadio José Dellagiovanna. On 6 March 2020, on his twenty-fourth appearance, Vera scored his first senior goal in a win over Rosario Central.

International career
In 2017, Vera was selected by the Argentina U17s for the 2017 South American U-17 Championship. They were knocked out at the first group stage, with Vera featuring in matches with Venezuela, Peru and Brazil. Vera won three caps for the Argentina U20s at the 2018 COTIF Tournament. He also featured for the U19s and trained against the senior squad in 2017. In December 2018, Vera was selected for the 2019 South American U-20 Championship. In May 2019, Fernando Batista called up Vera for the 2019 FIFA U-20 World Cup. He scored in their 5–2 matchday one win over South Africa on 25 May; in appearance one of three.

Vera received a call-up for the 2019 Pan American Games with the U23s in Peru. He appeared five times, including once in the final as he also scored, as they won the competition.

Career statistics
.

Honours
Argentina U23
Pan American Games: 2019
Pre-Olympic Tournament: 2020

Personal life
Vera is of Paraguayan descent through his paternal grandparents.

References

External links

2000 births
Living people
People from Hurlingham Partido
Sportspeople from Buenos Aires Province
Argentine footballers
Association football midfielders
Argentine Primera División players
Campeonato Brasileiro Série A players
Argentinos Juniors footballers
Sport Club Corinthians Paulista players
Argentina youth international footballers
Argentina under-20 international footballers
Footballers at the 2019 Pan American Games
Medalists at the 2019 Pan American Games
Pan American Games medalists in football
Pan American Games gold medalists for Argentina
Olympic footballers of Argentina
Footballers at the 2020 Summer Olympics
Argentine sportspeople of Paraguayan descent